Finn Halvorsen (born 21 February 1947) is a Norwegian former ski jumper. He was born in Våler in Hedmark. He competed at the 1976 Winter Olympics in Innsbruck, in normal hill and large hill.

References

External links

1947 births
Living people
People from Våler, Norway
Norwegian male ski jumpers
Olympic ski jumpers of Norway
Ski jumpers at the 1976 Winter Olympics
Sportspeople from Innlandet